disambiguation:
 "Embryonic Journey" (instrumental) refers to a song by Jorma Kaukonen, guitarist for Jefferson Airplane
 Embryonic Journey (album) is an album by Jorma Kaukonen and Tom Constanten, one-time keyboardist for the Grateful Dead